"Something from Nothing" is a song by the American rock band Foo Fighters from their eighth studio album Sonic Highways. It was released as the album's lead single on October 16, 2014. Recorded at Steve Albini's Electrical Audio studio, the song was influenced by the Chicago music scene.

Composition

"Something from Nothing" has been regarded as an alternative rock and hard rock song. According to Daniel Kreps of the Rolling Stone magazine, the lyrics of the song "Here lies a city on fire... it started with a spark, and burned into the dark" seem to be inspired by the Great Chicago Fire (1871).

"Something from Nothing" is "a ferocious, at times even hypnotic, rocker with hints of funk, psychedelia, and Dave Grohl's signature monster growl." It features soaring guitar that is reminiscent of Chicago-based alternative rock band The Smashing Pumpkins; and at one point, borrows heavily from the riff of Dio's heavy metal song "Holy Diver". The song starts with muffled guitar, and subsequently builds up to "non-stop ferocious rock 'n' roll" in its fourth minute, and "an ear-shattering outro lined with scorching guitar riffs."

Recording
"Something from Nothing" was recorded at Albini's Electrical Audio studio in Chicago. The song features guitarist Rick Nielsen of the rock band Cheap Trick as Chicago City's "guest of honor."

Music video
The music video aired at the end of the Foo Fighters: Sonic Highways "Chicago" episode. It shows the band performing at Electrical Audio while 2D animated lyrics appear in the background throughout the video. The video also features appearances by Rick Nielsen and Rami Jaffee.

Commercial performance
"Something from Nothing" debuted at number five on the Billboard Rock Airplay chart, as well as at number 12 and number 16 on Billboards Alternative Songs and Mainstream Rock charts respectively. It soon rose to number one on all three charts. "Something from Nothing" is also the twenty-fifth Foo Fighters' single to make the top 75 on the UK Singles Chart, and the twenty-seventh Foo Fighters' single to make the top 100 on the Australian Singles Chart.

Charts

Weekly charts

Year-end charts

References

External links
Full Lyrics at LyricsOnDemand.com 

2014 singles
2014 songs
Foo Fighters songs
Song recordings produced by Butch Vig
Songs written by Dave Grohl
Songs about Chicago
Songs written by Taylor Hawkins
Songs written by Nate Mendel
Songs written by Chris Shiflett
Songs written by Pat Smear